Domenico Monleone (January 4, 1875 – 15 January 1942) was an Italian composer of operas, most noted for his opera Cavalleria rusticana of 1907, which for a while rivalled the success of Mascagni's work of the same name which was from the same source. The work was the third opera to be based on Verga's 1884 theatrical adaptation of his own short story, Cavalleria rusticana, Stanislao Gastaldon’s Mala Pasqua (1888) being the first, and Mascagni's famous opera (1890) being the second. 
Mascagni and his lawyers intervened and Monleone changed the opera ‘beyond recognition’  setting the music to a new libretto. In this form it was presented as La giostra dei falchi in 1914.

There have been recent revivals of Monleone's original Cavalleria rusticana in Tirana (Albania) and (more successfully) in Montpellier (France) in 2001. Also in Albania there has been (1998) a revival (radio concert) of Il mistero conducted by Daniel Pacitti which has been released on CD.

Compositions
Cavalleria rusticana, 2 May 1907, Amsterdam
Una novella del Boccaccio, 26 May 1909, Genoa
Alba eroica, 5 May 1910, Genoa
Arabesca, 3 November 1913, Rome
La giostra dei falchi - the music of Cavalleria rusticana (above) to a new libretto, 17 April 1914, Turin 
Suona la ritirata, 23 May 1916, Milan
Fauvette, 3 February 1926, Genoa 
Il mistero, 7 May 1921, Venice, revised 1934,Turin 
Scheuggio Campanna, 1928, Genoa
La ronda di notte del Rembrandt, 1933 Genoa
Notte di nozze, 17 September 1940, Bergamo

References

External links
 

1875 births
1942 deaths
Italian classical composers
Italian male classical composers
Italian opera composers
Male opera composers
20th-century classical composers
20th-century Italian composers
20th-century Italian male musicians